is a city located on the Ashida River in Hiroshima Prefecture, Japan. As of September 30, 2019, the city has an estimated population of 468,812 and a population density of 904.80 persons per km2.

After Hiroshima, it is the largest city in Hiroshima Prefecture and is located on the far east side of the prefecture. The city's symbol is the rose and it holds an annual Rose Festival in the month of May. The official mascot of Fukuyama is an anthropomorphic rose child by the name of Rola. Fukuyama is a vital commercial, industrial and communications center. It produces machinery, koto (Japanese harps), rubber products, electronics, textiles, and processed foods.

History 
What is today the city of Fukuyama was founded as a castle town in 1619 by Mizuno Katsunari,  a cousin of shōgun Tokugawa Ieyasu. Mizuno was given command of a territory in western Japan consisting of southern Bingo Province and southwestern Bitchu Province.  He built a new castle-town as his capital and called it Fukuyama.

After the abolition of the han system in 1871, Fukuyama Prefecture was founded. A short time later the prefecture was renamed Fukatsu. Fukatsu Prefecture was merged with Kurashiki Prefecture in 1872 to form Oda Prefecture. In 1875 Oda Prefecture was merged into Okayama Prefecture.

When the border between Hiroshima and Okayama prefectures was re-arranged in 1876, Fukuyama Town became a part of Hiroshima Prefecture.

Fukuyama Town became Fukuyama City on July 1, 1916. The population of the city at that time was 32,356.

On August 8, 1945 (two days after the atomic-bombing of Hiroshima), 91 American B-29 bombers made an air raid on Fukuyama, destroying much of the city.

Fukuyama was named one of the core cities of Japan on April 1, 1998.

Mergers with surrounding towns
In 1933, 10 villages from surrounding Fukayasu District were merged into Fukuyama. Two additional villages from Numakuma District were similarly merged in 1942.

On March 31, 1954, several towns and villages in Kōrimatsu District merged to found the city of Matsunaga. Matsunaga City would eventually merge with Fukuyama City on May 1, 1966.

Several towns and villages from the Fukayasu District merged into Fukuyama in 1956, and Fukayasu Town merged in 1962.

Several other surrounding towns and districts eventually merged with Fukuyama: 
April 1, 1974, Ashida Town in Ashina District
February 1, 1975, Kamo Town, Fukayasu District and Ekiya Town, Ashina District
February 3, 2003, Utsumi Town in Numakuma District and Shin'ichi Town in Ashina District, thereby dissolving Ashina District
February 1, 2005 Numakuma Town, dissolving Numakuma District
March 1, 2006 Kannabe Town in Fukayasu District, dissolving the district

Geography

Climate
Fukuyama has a humid subtropical climate (Köppen climate classification Cfa) with very warm summers and cool winters. Precipitation is significant throughout the year, but is somewhat lower in winter.

Demographics
Per Japanese census data, the population of Fukuyama in 2020 is 460,930 people. Fukuyama has been conducting censuses since 1960.

Transportation 
The city is a regional rail hub and a stop on the coastal Sanyō line as well as a terminus for the Fukuen line extending north into Hiroshima Prefecture.  Additionally, four types of Shinkansen train on the Sanyō Shinkansen line (limited express Nozomi, express Hikari, Kyuushu shinkansen and local Kodama) stop there, making the city easily accessible from anywhere in Japan.

Regional and city buses carry passengers throughout the city and link it to other cities in the region.  Some of the cities reachable by highway bus are Hiroshima, Kobe, Kyoto, Matsue, Okayama, Osaka, Tokyo, Ehime's Imabari City & Matsuyama city and Yonago.

Education 
Fukuyama is home to some 70 elementary schools, several dozen junior high schools and roughly twenty high schools, both public and private.  Fukuyama University is located in the northwestern district of Matsunaga.  The university offers many courses of study, but is best known for its excellent pharmacology program. Fukuyama City Junior College for Women is located in the Kita Honjo district.

The Holocaust Education Center in Fukuyama, inaugurated on June 17, 1995, is dedicated to the memory of 1.5 million children who were murdered in the Holocaust. It has the distinction of being the first institution in Japan devoted to Holocaust education.

Shopping
Fukuyama is home to several large department stores, including Lotz, Tenmaya, and Ito Yokado/Happy Town/Port Plaza. Kannabe-cho is home to the department store Fuji Grand.  Many shops selling traditional Japanese goods can be found along the city's Hondori (covered shopping arcade), as well as throughout the city.

Further away from the center of town are the districts of Matsunaga, known for its traditional Japanese footwear, called geta, and Tomo-no-Ura, a fishing village known for its traditional sea bream netting display every May.

Sights 

 Tomonoura - fishing port of numerous temples and shrines; approximately 30 minutes south of Fukuyama by bus (14 km from Fukuyama).
 Myōōin - Buddhist temple with two national treasures.
 Taichōrō - temple hall on the hill behind the ferry terminal was built at the end of the 17th century to house a Korean delegation, which would at times pay its respects.
 Uono-sato - snack-food factory that processes most of the locally-caught fish. One can observe workers make chikuwa (ground-fish snacks) and senbei (rice crackers).
 Fukuyama Castle
 Kusado Sengen, a medieval town excavated in the Ashida River
 Fukuyama Hachimangū Shinto shrine

Twin towns/Sister cities
 Kazanlak, Bulgaria
 Hamilton, Ontario, Canada
 Okazaki, Aichi, Japan
 Pohang City, North Gyeongsang, South Korea
 Tacloban City, Philippines
 Maui, Hawaii, United States
 Gotham City, New Jersey, United States

Notable people from Fukuyama, Hiroshima
 Mana Endo, Japanese professional tennis player 
 Anri Sugihara, Japanese gravure idol
 Jun Fukuyama, Japanese voice actor and singer (Code Geass, Love, Chunibyo & Other Delusions, Persona 5, Osomatsu-san, Assassination Classroom, Working!!, K, Oresuki and Jewelpet)
 Hirotaka Egusa, Nippon Professional Baseball pitcher
 Soji Shimada, Japanese mystery writer
 NOCCHi, Japanese singer, dancer and J-Pop idol, member of J-Pop girlgroup Perfume (Real Name: Ayano Ōmoto, Nihongo: 大本 彩乃, Ōmoto Ayano)
 Takuya Mitsuda, Japanese manga artist (Major)
 Kotomi Kyono, Japanese actress and J-Pop singer
 Yuhki Kamatani, Japanese manga artist and illustrator (Nabari no Ou)
 Fumiaki Kobayashi,  Japanese politician representing Hiroshima 7th district in the House of Representatives, the lower house of the National Diet, for the Liberal Democratic Party (LDP)
 Masuji Ibuse, Japanese author (Black Rain)
 Tatsuo Kawai, Japanese diplomat and author
 Katsuhisa Fujii, retired mixed martial artist and professional wrestler
 Makoto Hashi, former Japanese professional wrestler
 Makoto Izumitani, Japanese drummer
 Yuji Shimada, a Japanese mixed martial arts and professional wrestling referee, professional wrestling booker, authority figure and occasional wrestler
 Kazuhiro Nakamura, retired Japanese mixed martial artist
 Hiroyuki Nakano, Japanese film director
 Naomi Nishida, Japanese actress (Nabbie's Love)
 Masanori Sera, Japanese singer and actor
 Kotaro Miyachi, Japanese former professional tennis player
 Hiroshi Miyazawa, Japanese politician, former governor of Hiroshima Prefecture, younger brother of Kiichi Miyazawa and father of Yoichi Miyazawa
 Kiichi Miyazawa, Japanese politician, former Prime Minister of Japan, older brother of Hiroshi Miyazawa and uncle of Yoichi Miyazawa
 Yoichi Miyazawa, Japanese politician, member of the Liberal Democratic Party (LDP), son of Hiroshi Miyazawa and nephew of Kiichi Miyazawa
 Konami, Japanese professional wrestler (Real Name: Konami Takemoto, Nihongo: 竹本 小波, Takemoto Konami)
 Kenji Imaizumi, Japanese professional shogi player ranked 5-dan

References

External links

 Fukuyama City official website 
 Holocaust Education Center, Japan
 
 

 
Cities in Hiroshima Prefecture
Port settlements in Japan
Populated coastal places in Japan
Populated places established in 1619
1619 establishments in Japan